Abscondita promelaena, is a species of firefly beetle found in India and Sri Lanka.

Description
Dorsum pale brownish with pale coloured elytra without an apical brown marking. Elytral apices are whitish due to aggregation of white material probably fat body. Terminal abdominal tergites are pale. Male is about 8.7 to 10.3 mm in length. Pronotum, and elytra very pale brown. Due to semitransparency of elytra, underlying muscles and hind wings are visible. Mouthparts and antennae are very dark brown whereas head is dark reddish brown. Ventral side of prothorax and mesothorax are pale yellowish brown. Metathorax ventrum is moderately dark brown. Legs with pale brown bases, brown tibiae and tarsi. Abdomen brownish. Pronotum is 1.5 to 1.8 mm long. Aedeagal sheath consists with sternite terminated by short rounded hairy posterolateral projections. Female is 10 to 11.7 mm long and pronotum is 1.5 to 1.9 mm long.

References 

Lampyridae
Insects of Sri Lanka
Beetles described in 1858